{{Speciesbox
| image = Hoverfly. Ornidia obesa - Flickr - gailhampshire (1).jpg
| genus = Ornidia
| species = obesa
| authority = (Fabricius, 1775)
| display_parents = 2
| synonyms = *Syrphus obesa Fabricius, 1775
Musca nero Curtiss, 1938
Volucella obesoides Giglio-Tos, 1892
}}Ornidia obesa''''' is a species of syrphid fly in the family Syrphidae.

References

Further reading

External links

 
 

Eristalinae
Insects described in 1775
Diptera of South America
Diptera of North America
Diptera of Asia
Diptera of Africa
Taxa named by Johan Christian Fabricius